ARC Resources Ltd. (ARC) is a Canadian energy company with operations focused in the Montney resource play in Alberta and northeast British Columbia. The company has been operating since 1996. ARC pays a quarterly dividend to shareholders and its common shares trade on the Toronto Stock Exchange under the symbol ARX.

History
ARC was founded in 1996 as a royalty trust with the acquisition of 21 properties from Mobil Oil Canada.  The acquisition was funded by an initial IPO of $180 million on the Toronto Stock Exchange.  The company operated as a royalty trust from inception in 1996 until December 31, 2010. As a result of the Canadian Government's change in the tax treatment of trusts ARC converted from a trust to a corporation on January 1, 2011.

Acquisitions and Disposals 

 In 1999, ARC acquires Starcor Energy Royalty Fund and Orion Energy Trust.
 In 2001, ARC reaches $1 billion market capitalization. ARC completes the acquisition of Startech Energy Inc. for $340 million deal. 
 In 2003, ARC purchases Star Oil & Gas Ltd. for $710 million, including the Dawson gas field.
 In 2005, ARC announces a $462 million strategic acquisition of properties in the Pembina and Redwater fields from Imperial Oil and ExxonMobil.
 In 2010, ARC completes the acquisition of Storm Exploration Inc., adding the Parkland field.
 In 2016, ARC sold $700 million in assets in Southeast Saskatchewan to Spartan Energy Corporation.
 In 2021, ARC closed its strategic combination with Seven Generations Energy Ltd. in an all stock deal valued at $8.1 billion inclusive of debt. The resulting company continued to operate as ARC Resources Ltd.

Areas of Operation
With operations spanning western Canada, ARC's activities include the exploration, development and production of conventional oil and natural gas reserves.  As at Q2 2021, ARC’s commodity mix was approximately 60% natural gas and 40% liquids.

ARC has operations in two core areas across Western Canada:
 Northeast British Columbia, including the Attachie, Greater Dawson, Parkland/Tower, and Sunrise fields 
Northern Alberta, including the Ante Creek and Kakwa field

External links
 Official web site
 SEDAR company profile

References

Oil companies of Canada
Companies based in Calgary
Energy companies established in 1996
Non-renewable resource companies established in 1996
1996 establishments in Alberta
Companies listed on the Toronto Stock Exchange
Canadian companies established in 1996
2021 mergers and acquisitions